Aghavrin Cottage is a two-storey dwelling in Aghavrin townland,  north-west of Coachford village in County Cork, Ireland.

It is indicated on the 1901 surveyed OS map, having been constructed c. 1900. It replaced the former Aghavrin Cottage, indicated on the 1841 surveyed OS map, which was a single-storey building with a thatched roof, the nearby ruins of which can still be seen today.
 
Lewis's Topographical Dictionary of Ireland (1837) refers to Rev. I. Smith of 'Ahavrin Cottage'.  The tithe applotment book for the civil parish of Aghabullogue records 'Reverend John Smith' of 'Ahavren' as occupying 5 acres.

It remains a private residence, and is not accessible to the public.

See also
Aghavrin (townland)
Aghavrin House
Aghavrin Clapper Bridge
Aghavrin Mass Rock
Crooke's Castle, Aghavrin
St Olan's, Aghavrin
Mullinhassig Wood & Waterfalls, Aghavrin

References

External links
 1841 surveyed OS map (maps.osi.ie)
 1901 surveyed OS map (maps.osi.ie)
 acrheritage.info

Buildings and structures in County Cork
Houses in the Republic of Ireland